Valdeir may refer to:

 Valdeir Vieira (born 1944), Brazilian football manager
 Valdeir (footballer, born 1967), full name Valdeir Celso Moreira, Brazilian football striker and midfielder
 Valdeir (footballer, born 1977), full name Valdeir da Silva Santos, Brazilian football forward